Jochen Endreß (born 3 November 1972) is a retired German football player.

Honours
VfB Stuttgart
 UEFA Intertoto Cup: 2000

References

External links
 

German footballers
VfB Stuttgart players
VfB Stuttgart II players
SSV Reutlingen 05 players
TSG 1899 Hoffenheim players
Bundesliga players
2. Bundesliga players
1972 births
Living people
Association football defenders
West German footballers